James Dobbins may refer to:

James Dobbins (diplomat) (born 1942), American foreign policy official 
James C. Dobbins (born 1949), American academic and Japanologist

See also
James Dobbin (disambiguation)
Dobbins (disambiguation)